Hassan Naim is a Lebanese-Swiss biochemist. He currently holds the position of Director of the "Institut für Physiologische Chemie" (Institute for Physiological Chemistry/Biochemistry) at the University of Veterinary Medicine Hanover, while collaborating regularly with the University of Hannover.

Scientific career
Hassan Naim received his Ph.D. degree in Biochemistry from the University of Bern, Switzerland. Following appointments at the Biochemistry Department, University of Lausanne (membrane transport in T cells) and the University  Children’s Hospital Bern (structure and function of brush border membrane proteins) he moved in 1989 to the Biochemistry Department, University of Texas Southwestern Medical Center at Dallas, USA to continue his work on structure-function relationships of brush border proteins. In 1991 he was recruited as a group leader and Faculty member at the University of Düsseldorf, Germany. In 1997 he was appointed as a Professor and Chair of the Department of Biochemistry at the University of Veterinary Medicine in Hannover, Germany.

Current Research Interests
Current research interests in the Naim laboratory focus on the molecular mechanisms underlying protein trafficking, particularly polarized protein sorting in epithelial cells, in health and disease.

Publications
Some of Naim's recent publications include (but are not limited to):
 
 Maalouf K, Jia J, Rizk S, Brogden G, Keiser M, Das A, Naim HY A modified lipid composition in Fabry disease leads to an intracellular block of the detergent-resistant membrane-associated dipeptidyl peptidase IV
 Sim L, Willemsma C, Mohan S, Naim HY, Pinto BM, Rose DR Structural basis for substrate selectivity in human maltase-glucoamylase and sucrase-isomaltase N-terminal domains
 Krahn MP, Rizk S, Alfalah M, Behrendt M, Naim HY Protocadherin of the liver, kidney and colon associates with detergent-resistant membranes during cellular differentiation
 Zimmer KP, Fischer I, Mothes T, Weissen-Plenz G, Schmitz M, Wieser H, Mendez E, Buening J, Lerch MM, Ciclitira PC, Weber P, Naim HY Endocytotic Segregation of Gliadin Peptide 31-49 in Enterocytes
 Behrendt M, Polaina J, Naim HY Structural hierarchy of regulatory elements in the folding and transport of an intestinal multi-domain protein

References

Year of birth missing (living people)
Living people
Lebanese emigrants to Switzerland
Scientists from Beirut
Biochemists
University of Bern alumni
Academic staff of the University of Lausanne
German people of Lebanese descent